Hard bop is a subgenre of jazz that is an extension of bebop (or "bop") music. Journalists and record companies began using the term in the mid-1950s to describe a new current within jazz which incorporated influences from rhythm and blues, gospel music, and blues, especially in saxophone and piano playing. David H. Rosenthal contends in his book Hard Bop that the genre is, to a large degree, the natural creation of a generation of African-American musicians who grew up at a time when bop and rhythm and blues were the dominant forms of black American music. Prominent hard bop musicians included Horace Silver, Charles Mingus, Art Blakey, Cannonball Adderley, Miles Davis and Tadd Dameron. Hard bop is sometimes referred to as "funky hard bop."  The "funky" label refers to the rollicking, rhythmic feeling associated with the style.  The descriptor is also used to describe soul jazz, which is commonly associated with hard bop.

A
Pepper Adams - baritone saxophone
Cannonball Adderley - alto saxophone
Ahmad Alaadeen - saxophone
Eric Alexander - saxophone
Carl Allen - drums
Eddie Allen - trumpet, flugelhorn
Sinan Alimanović - piano, composer, arranger, conductor, educator
Gene Ammons - tenor saxophone
Curtis Amy - saxophone
Gilad Atzmon - saxophone

B
Benny Bailey - trumpet
Gabe Baltazar - saxophone
Bootsie Barnes - saxophone
Kenny Barron - piano
Gary Bartz - saxophone
Marcus Belgrave - trumpet
Walter Bishop, Jr. - piano
Art Blakey - drums
Terence Blanchard - trumpet
Walter Booker - bass
Michael Brecker - tenor saxophone
Cecil Brooks III - drums
Tina Brooks - saxophone
Bobby Broom - guitar
Clifford Brown - trumpet
Kenny Burrell - guitar
Donald Byrd - trumpet

C
Conte Candoli - trumpet
Ron Carter - double-bass
Paul Chambers - double-bass
Pete Christlieb - saxophone
Sonny Clark - piano
Thomas Clausen - piano
James Clay - saxophone
Jimmy Cleveland - trombone
Jimmy Cobb - drums
Tony Coe - saxophone, clarinet
George Coleman - saxophone
Johnny Coles - trumpet
John Coltrane - tenor and soprano saxophone
Robert Conti - guitar
Bob Cooper - sax, oboe
Ray Copeland - trumpet
Bob Cranshaw - double-bass
Hank Crawford - saxophone
Sonny Criss - saxophone
Tony Crombie - drums
Curtis Counce - double-bass
Ronnie Cuber -saxophone
Ted Curson - trumpet
Junior Cook - saxophone

D
Carsten Dahl - piano
Eddie Daniels - sax, clarinet
Art Davis - double-bass
Eddie "Lockjaw" Davis - sax
Jesse Davis - sax
Miles Davis - trumpet
Nathan Davis - sax
Richard Davis - double-bass
Steve Davis - trombone
Walter Davis, Jr. - piano
Alan Dawson - drums
Barbara Dennerlein - organ
Jimmy Deuchar - trumpet
John D'earth - trumpet
Niels Lan Doky - piano
Lou Donaldson - sax
Kenny Dorham - trumpet
Ray Draper - tuba
Kenny Drew - piano
Ted Dunbar - guitar

E
Charles Earland - organ
Teddy Edwards - sax
Mark Elf - guitar
Booker Ervin - sax

F
Art Farmer - trumpet, flugelhorn
Joe Farrell - flute, sax
Victor Feldman - piano, vibes
Tommy Flanagan - piano
Ricky Ford - sax
Frank Foster - sax
Von Freeman - sax
Curtis Fuller - trombone

G
Red Garland - piano
Benny Golson - tenor saxophone
Dexter Gordon - tenor saxophone
Benny Green (pianist) - piano
Grant Green - guitar
Johnny Griffin - tenor saxophone
Gigi Gryce - saxophone
Randy Gelispie - drums

H
Charlie Haden - double-bass
Tim Hagans - trumpet
Chico Hamilton - drums
Slide Hampton - trombone
Herbie Hancock - piano
Roland Hanna - piano
Wilbur Harden - trumpet
Bill Hardman - trumpet, flugelhorn
Roy Hargrove - trumpet
Philip Harper - trumpet
Barry Harris - piano
Eddie Harris - saxophone, organ
Stefon Harris - vibraphone
Antonio Hart - sax
Hampton Hawes - piano
Louis Hayes - drums
Roy Haynes - drums
Jimmy Heath - sax
Percy Heath - double-bass
Albert Heath - drums
Bill Heid - piano, keyboards
Joe Henderson - sax
Wayne Henderson - trombone
Vincent Herring - sax
Billy Higgins - drums
Buck Hill - sax
Ron Holloway - tenor saxophone
Richard Holmes - organ
Stix Hooper - drums
Elmo Hope - piano
Lex Humphries - drums
Freddie Hubbard - trumpet
Bobby Hutcherson - vibraphone, marimba

I
Eric Ineke - drums

J
Milt Jackson - vibraphone
Clifford Jarvis - drums
Bobby Jaspar - sax, flute
J. J. Johnson - trombone
LaMont Johnson - piano
Marc Johnson - bass
Carmell Jones - trumpet
Elvin Jones - drums
Hank Jones - piano
Philly Joe Jones - drums
Sam Jones - double-bass
Thad Jones - trumpet
Clifford Jordan - sax
Duke Jordan - piano

K
Geoff Keezer - piano
Wynton Kelly - piano
Rahsaan Roland Kirk - tenor sax, flute
Ryan Kisor - trumpet

L
Pat LaBarbera - sax, clarinet
Harold Land - sax
John LaPorta - sax, clarinet
Pete La Roca - drums
Yusef Lateef - sax
Doug Lawrence - sax
Hubert Laws - flute, sax
Hugh Lawson - piano
Herbie Lewis - double-bass
Victor Lewis - drums
Booker Little - trumpet
Joe Lovano - sax

M
Harold Mabern - piano
Jon Mayer - piano
Larance Marable - drums
Hank Marr - organ
Branford Marsalis - sax
Pat Martino - guitar
Cal Massey - trumpet
Christian McBride - double-bass
Les McCann - piano, keyboards
Jack McDuff - organ
Howard McGhee - trumpet
Gary McFarland - vibraphone, vocals
Al McKibbon - double-bass
Jackie McLean - sax
René McLean - sax, flute
Charles McPherson - sax
Jymie Merritt - double-bass
Pierre Michelot - double-bass
Mulgrew Miller - piano
Charles Mingus - double-bass
Blue Mitchell - trumpet
Billy Mitchell - sax
Red Mitchell - bass
Hank Mobley - sax
Thelonious Monk - piano
Buddy Montgomery - vibraphone, piano
Wes Montgomery - guitar
Tete Montoliu - piano
James Moody - sax
Frank Morgan - sax
Lee Morgan - trumpet
Dick Morrissey - sax, flute
Ronald Muldrow - guitar

N
Lewis Nash - drums
Oliver Nelson - sax
Phineas Newborn, Jr. - piano
David Newman - sax

P
Horace Parlan - piano
Don Patterson - organ
John Patton - organ
Cecil Payne - sax, flute
Duke Pearson - piano
Niels-Henning Ørsted Pedersen - double-bass
Art Pepper - sax
Bill Perkins - saxophone, flute
Carl Perkins - piano 
Walter Perkins - drums
Houston Person - sax
Art Phipps - bass
Richie Powell - piano
Bud Powell - piano

Q
Ike Quebec - sax

R
Jimmy Raney - guitar
Sonny Red - alto sax
Freddie Redd - piano
Dizzy Reece - trumpet
Emily Remler - guitar
Melvin Rhyne - organ
Jerome Richardson - sax
Larry Ridley - bass
Ben Riley - drums
Max Roach - drums
Marcus Roberts - piano
Red Rodney - trumpet
Sonny Rollins - sax
Wallace Roney - trumpet
Renee Rosnes - piano
Jim Rotondi - trumpet
Charlie Rouse - sax

S
Joe Sample - piano
Pharoah Sanders - saxophone
Rhoda Scott - organ
Shirley Scott - organ
Woody Shaw - trumpet
Sahib Shihab - sax, flute
Wayne Shorter - sax
Horace Silver - piano
Zoot Sims - sax
Jimmy Smith - organ
Dr. Lonnie Smith - organ
Melvin Sparks - guitar
James Spaulding - saxophone
Leon Spencer - organ
Sonny Stitt - sax
Idrees Sulieman - trumpet
Ira Sullivan - trumpet, flugelhorn

T
Grady Tate - drums
Art Taylor - drums
Billy Taylor - piano
Henri Texier - double-bass
Lucky Thompson - sax
The Three Sounds
Bobby Timmons - piano
Andrzej Trzaskowski - piano
Stanley Turrentine - sax
Tommy Turrentine - trumpet
McCoy Tyner - piano

V
Harold Vick - sax, flute

W
Freddie Waits - drums
Mal Waldron - piano
Winston Walls - organ
Cedar Walton - piano
Wilbur Ware - double-bass
Butch Warren - double-bass
Kenny Washington - drums
Peter Washington - double-bass
Doug Watkins - double-bass
Julius Watkins - French horn
Michael Weiss - piano
Randy Weston - piano
Mark Whitfield - guitar
Don Wilkerson - sax
Baby Face Willette - organ
Buster Williams - double-bass
Tony Williams - drums
Jack Wilson - piano
Ben Wolfe - bass
Phil Woods - sax, clarinet
Reggie Workman - double-bass
Richard Wyands - piano

Y
Larry Young - organ

Z
Joe Zawinul - piano, keyboards

Notes 

 Hard bop
 
Hard bop